Luch is a rural locality (a settlement) in Andreyevskoye Rural Settlement, Alexandrovsky District, Vladimir Oblast, Russia. The population was 61 as of 2010.

Geography 
The village is located 14 km west from Andreyevskoye and 3 km east from Alexandrov.

References 

Rural localities in Alexandrovsky District, Vladimir Oblast